Metafruticicola is a genus of gastropods belonging to the family Hygromiidae.

The species of this genus are found in Mediterranean regions.

Species:

Metafruticicola andria 
Metafruticicola berytensis 
Metafruticicola coartata 
Metafruticicola crassicosta 
Metafruticicola dedegoelensis 
Metafruticicola dictaea 
Metafruticicola genezarethana 
Metafruticicola hermonensis 
Metafruticicola kizildagensis 
Metafruticicola maaseni 
Metafruticicola monticola 
Metafruticicola naxiana 
Metafruticicola nicosiana 
Metafruticicola noverca 
Metafruticicola occidentalis 
Metafruticicola oerstani 
Metafruticicola ottmari 
Metafruticicola pellita 
Metafruticicola pieperi 
Metafruticicola redtenbacheri 
Metafruticicola rugosissima 
Metafruticicola schuberti 
Metafruticicola shileykoi 
Metafruticicola sublecta 
Metafruticicola uluborluensis 
Metafruticicola yatagana 
Metafruticicola zonella

References

Hygromiidae